Pseudotropine (3β-tropanol, ψ-tropine, 3-pseudotropanol, or PTO) is a derivative of tropane and an isomer of tropine.  Pseudotropine can be found in the Coca plant along with several other alkaloids

See also 
 Pseudotropine acyltransferase
 Pseudotropine benzoate (tropacocaine)
 Atropine
 Tropine
 Tropinone

References 

Tropanes
Secondary alcohols